Walter Henry "Doc" Snell (May 19, 1889 – July 23, 1980) was a pinch-hitter/catcher in Major League Baseball who played briefly for the Boston Red Sox during the  season. Following this brief baseball career he became a successful mycologist who worked primarily at Brown University for the next 60 years.

Baseball career
In 1913, he was signed by the Philadelphia Athletics owner Connie Mack, but broke his hand in a game at Brown and was dealt to the Red Sox.

In a six-game career, Snell was a .250 hitter (3-for-12) with one run and one stolen base without RBI or home runs. In two catching appearances, he committed one error in 13 chances accepted for a .923 fielding percentage.  Snell hit a single in his first major league at bat off Cleveland Naps pitcher Nick Cullop on August 1, 1913.  He was one of five catchers the Red Sox used during the 1913 season.

Following his majors career, Snell continued to play some minor league baseball while studying for his master's degree, playing in 1914 and 1915 in the International League with the Toronto Maple Leafs (1914) and Rochester Hustlers (1915), and for the Manchester team of the New England League (1915), becoming a first baseman in his last baseball season.

Doctoral career
After receiving his master's degree from Brown in 1915, Snell earned a Ph.D. degree in botany. In the summer of 1923, he managed the Hyannis town team in the Cape Cod Baseball League.

Personal life
Snell married twice.  His second wife, Esther A. Dick (later Esther Dick Snell), was a fellow mycologist who co-wrote A Glossary of the Fungi with him, among other works.

Snell died at the age of 91 in Providence, Rhode Island.

References

External links
 Baseball Reference
 Retrosheet
 SABR Biography

1889 births
1980 deaths
American mycologists
Boston Red Sox players
Major League Baseball catchers
Brown Bears athletic directors
Brown Bears baseball coaches
Brown Bears baseball players
Brown Bears football coaches
Cape Cod Baseball League coaches
Manchester Textiles players
Phillips Academy alumni
University of Wisconsin–Madison College of Letters and Science alumni
Baseball players from Massachusetts
People from West Bridgewater, Massachusetts
Sportspeople from Plymouth County, Massachusetts